Diaphus similis is a species of lanternfish found in the Eastern Central Pacific Ocean.

Size

References

Myctophidae
Taxa named by Robert Lester Wisner
Fish described in 1974